The  is a Japanese manufacturer of power tools formed with the September 2008 merger of the Kioritz and Shindaiwa corporations.  The brands owned and distributed by Yamabiko are Kioritz, Shindaiwa and Echo.  The Yamabiko Corporation is based in Ome, Japan.

History

Kioritz Corporation  

The Kioritz Corporation (Kyōritsu) was a global manufacturer of forestry and agricultural machinery, as well as outdoor power equipment.  The company was founded on 8 September 1947, by the Asamoto brothers, primarily to manufacture agricultural machinery.  Until 1971, the company operated under the name, Kyoritsu Noki Company.  In 1971, the Kyoritsu Noki Company changed its name to the Kioritz Corporation and launched the CS-302, its first 'professional' saw and the first to bear its distinctive orange casing.  It began trading under the Echo brand name in 1978.

In its founding year, the company launched a revolutionary engine-powered manual crop duster. Until the 1960s, the company concentrated on the manufacture of power dusters, mist blowers and other pest control machinery. The first Kyoritsu Noki brushcutter was introduced in 1960 and three years later, the company launched its first chainsaw, the Echo CS-80, and the first Kyoritsu Noki tool to bear the "Echo" brand name.  In 1970, Kyoritsu claimed to have 'revolutionized' outdoor cleaning with the PB-9, a backpack power blower.  The Echo brand of hand-held petrol powered tools including chainsaws, brushcutters, hedge trimmers and leaf blowers are manufactured in Yokosuka and Morioka, with other major plants in Shenzhen, China and Lake Zurich, Illinois.

Shindaiwa Incorporated  

Shindaiwa Incorporated is a global manufacturer of welding machines, generators, agricultural and forestry machinery, and outdoor power equipment.  The company originally manufactured electrical and industrial products.  Shindaiwa launched its first chainsaw in Japan in 1955.  In September 2008, the company merged with Kioritz to form the Yamabiko Corporation.  Manufacture of Shindaiwa products in Japan is in Yokosuka, Morioka, and Hiroshima, with other plants in Shenzhen, China, and Lake Zurich, Illinois.

Merger 
On 1 September 2008, Kioritz and Shindaiwa merged under one holding company, the Yamabiko Corporation.

References

External links 

 Yamabiko global website 

Manufacturing companies based in Tokyo
Power tool manufacturers
Tool manufacturing companies of Japan
Companies listed on the Tokyo Stock Exchange
Japanese companies established in 2008
Manufacturing companies established in 2008
Japanese brands
Chainsaws